Ula Point is a low ice-covered point in the Erebus and Terror Gulf, on the northeast coast of James Ross Island, 5 miles (8 km) northwest of Cape Gage. First seen and roughly surveyed by Swedish Antarctic Expedition, 1901–04, under Otto Nordenskjold. It was resurveyed by Falkland Islands Dependencies Survey (FIDS) in 1945. Named by United Kingdom Antarctic Place-Names Committee (UK-APC) for Anton Olsen Ula, boatswain on the Antarctic the ship of the above Swedish expedition.

Barker Bank is a submarine bank extending north from Ula Point into the Erebus and Terror Gulf. Its limits are not precisely defined. It was charted from HMS Endurance, 1981–82, and named by the UK Antarctic Place-Names Committee after Captain Nicholas J. Barker, Royal Navy, who was in command of the ship, 1980–82.

References 

Headlands of James Ross Island